Marysville is a city in and the county seat of Marshall County, Kansas, United States.  As of the 2020 census, the population of the city was 3,447.

History

Marysville was laid out in 1855 by Francis J. Marshall, and designated in that same year the county seat. It was incorporated as a city in 1861.

Marysville was located on the Oregon Trail and the route of the Pony Express, the St. Joe Road, the Overland Stage, The Military Road, and the Otoe-Missouria Trail.  British explorer Richard Francis Burton en route to California in 1860 noted: "Passing by Marysville, in old maps Palmetto City, a country-town which thrives by selling whiskey to ruffians of all descriptions ..."  The old Pony Express Station still stands in downtown Marysville. In Beyond the Mississippi (1867), Albert D. Richardson, who passed through Marysville in 1860, wrote that the town—which was named after the Border Ruffian Marshall's wife—"had 50 houses and was famed for whisky and shooting affrays."

Marysville owed much of its prosperity to the Union Pacific Railroad, which became a major employer. But as the city grew along the railroad most of the community was across the tracks from a good part of downtown.  As rail traffic increased, vehicular delays were estimated at 7.5 to 8 hours per day at the five grade crossings, which also affected emergency vehicles. In 2006 the main line was moved out of the center of town to a bypass to the south and west, with grade separations for US-36 and US-77.

Marysville is also known as the "Black Squirrel City" due to an isolated community of all-black squirrels that make their homes in the town. The squirrels are said to be the result of escapees from a traveling circus.

Geography
Marysville is located in northeast Kansas near the Nebraska border, about 75 miles (120 km) northwest of the Kansas capital of Topeka and 67 miles (108 km) south of Lincoln, Nebraska.

Demographics

2010 census
As of the census of 2010, there were 3,294 people, 1,468 households, and 859 families living in the city. The racial makeup of the city was 96.7% White, 0.3% African American, 0.2% Native American, 0.6% Asian, 0.8% from other races, and 1.4% from two or more races. Hispanic or Latino of any race were 2.6% of the population.

There were 1,468 households, of which 27.2% had children under the age of 18 living with them, 46.1% were married couples living together, 8.4% had a female householder with no husband present, 4.0% had a male householder with no wife present, and 41.5% were non-families. 38.1% of all households were made up of individuals, and 18.1% had someone living alone who was 65 years of age or older. The average household size was 2.20 and the average family size was 2.89.

The median age in the city was 41.8 years. 24% of residents were under the age of 18; 7% were between the ages of 18 and 24; 22.2% were from 25 to 44; 26.4% were from 45 to 64; and 20.5% were 65 years of age or older. The gender makeup of the city was 47.9% male and 52.1% female.

2000 census
As of the census of 2000, there were 3,271 people, 1,437 households, and 865 families living in the city. The racial makeup of the city was 98.04% White, 0.15% African American, 0.34% Native American, 0.49% Asian, 0.15% from other races, and 0.83% from two or more races. Hispanic or Latino of any race were 0.73% of the population.

There were 1,437 households, out of which 26.9% had children under the age of 18 living with them, 51.1% were married couples living together, 6.5% had a female householder with no husband present, and 39.8% were non-families. 36.5% of all households were made up of individuals, and 20.2% had someone living alone who was 65 years of age or older. The average household size was 2.19 and the average family size was 2.87.

In the city, the population was spread out, with 22.7% under the age of 18, 7.1% from 18 to 24, 24.6% from 25 to 44, 22.2% from 45 to 64, and 23.4% who were 65 years of age or older. The median age was 42 years. For every 100 females, there were 89.7 males. For every 100 females age 18 and over, there were 85.3 males.

The median income for a household in the city was $31,250, and the median income for a family was $40,427. Males had a median income of $28,065 versus $18,063 for females. The per capita income for the city was $19,196. About 5.7% of families and 8.5% of the population were below the poverty line, including 8.5% of those under age 18 and 4.3% of those age 65 or over.

Education

The community is served by Marysville USD 364 public school district.

Notable people
 Helen Arnold, Oklahoma House of Representative legislator (1976–82)
 Kenneth Dam, Deputy Secretary of State (1982–85)
 Brian Duensing, professional baseball player
 Ralph Elliott, accountant and developer of the Elliott Wave Theory
 Louis Hardin, a.k.a. Moondog, composer, musician and poet
 Michael McClure, poet and playwright
 Kendra Wecker, collegiate and professional basketball player

See also
 KNDY (AM) and KNDY-FM - radio stations

References

Further reading

External links

 City of Marysville
 Marysville - Directory of Public Officials
 Marysville - Tourist Information
 Marysville city map, KDOT

Cities in Kansas
County seats in Kansas
Cities in Marshall County, Kansas
Pony Express stations
Populated places established in 1855
1855 establishments in Kansas Territory